Balsamorhiza macrophylla  (cutleaf balsamroot) is a North American species of plants in the tribe Heliantheae of the family Asteraceae. The species is native to the northwestern United States, in Idaho, Montana, Wyoming, Utah, and Oregon. It grows in sagebrush scrublands and conifer forests. It sometimes hybridizes with Balsamorhiza sagittata.

References

macrophylla
Plants described in 1840
Flora of the Northwestern United States
Flora without expected TNC conservation status